Jack H. McDonald (June 28, 1932 – August 17, 2022) was an American attorney and politician from the U.S. state of Michigan who served three terms in the U.S. House of Representatives from 1967 to 1973.

Biography 
McDonald was born in Detroit and was educated in White Lake Township and Detroit. He attended Wayne State University and served as supervisor of census for Wayne County with the Bureau of the Census in 1960. He was elected supervisor of Redford Township in 1961 and 1963, reelected in 1964. He was elected chairman of the  Wayne County Board of Supervisors in 1965. He was appointed to Republican Task Force on Urban Affairs in 1967.

Congress 
In 1966, he was the Republican Party candidate in Michigan's 19th congressional district. He defeated incumbent Democrat Billie S. Farnum, one of the "Five Fluke Freshmen", to be elected to the 90th Congress and to the two succeeding Congresses, serving from January 3, 1967, to January 3, 1973. In 1972, after redistricting, he ran in the same district as veteran Republican Representative William S. Broomfield. McDonald lost to Broomfield in the Republican primary elections.

Later career and death 
After leaving Congress, he became a consultant and lobbyist with law firm Verner, Liipfert, Bernhard, McPherson and Hand. He was a resident of Outer Banks, North Carolina.

He died on August 17, 2022, at the age of 90.

References

The Political Graveyard
Profile at the Revolving Door  at OpenSecrets.org

1932 births
2022 deaths
Politicians from Detroit
County commissioners in Michigan
Wayne State University alumni
Republican Party members of the United States House of Representatives from Michigan
Members of Congress who became lobbyists